Aloe forbesii is a small stemless Aloe native to Socotra, Yemen.

References

forbesii
Endemic flora of Socotra
Taxa named by Isaac Bayley Balfour